Huvudsta is a suburb of Stockholm in Solna Municipality, Sweden. In Huvudsta, near Vasastaden in Stockholm, stands the Karlberg Castle which was built in the 17th century.

The Huvudsta metro station was opened in 1985 as part of the Blue line.

The suburb is connected to Ulvsunda by the Huvudstabron.

References

Metropolitan Stockholm